Jacob Riley (born November 2, 1988) is an American long-distance runner. He placed second behind Galen Rupp at the 2020 US Olympic Marathon Trials, securing a spot at the 2020 Tokyo Olympics (which were rescheduled to start July 2021 due to the COVID-19 pandemic). Riley finished the race in a personal best time of 2:10:02. Riley was the first American (and ninth overall finisher) in the 2019 Chicago marathon, in a time of  2:10:36.

Riley represents the Boulder Track Club where he is coached by Lee Troop. Previously, he ran for the Hansons-Brooks Original Distance Project. In the 2016 US Olympic Trials Marathon, Riley finished 15th in 02:18:31. Riley won the 2012 USATF Club Cross Country Championship, covering the 10k race in a time of 29:58.

Collegiate career 
In college, Riley competed for Stanford University, where he was an 8-time All-American. Riley placed third in the 10,000m at the 2010 NCAA Championship, in a time of 28:57.41.

Personal life 
Riley is from Bellingham, Washington and resides in Boulder, Colorado.

Personal bests

References

Living people
American male long-distance runners
American male marathon runners
Stanford Cardinal men's cross country runners
1988 births
Athletes (track and field) at the 2020 Summer Olympics
Olympic track and field athletes of the United States